Potassium chlorate is a compound containing potassium, chlorine and oxygen, with the molecular formula KClO3. In its pure form, it is a white crystalline substance. After sodium chlorate, it is the second most common chlorate in industrial use. It is a strong oxidizing agent and its most important application is in safety matches. In other applications it is mostly obsolete and has been replaced by safer alternatives in recent decades. It has been used
 in fireworks, propellants and explosives,
 to prepare oxygen, both in the lab and in chemical oxygen generators,
 as a disinfectant, for example in medical mouthwashes,
 in agriculture as an herbicide.

Production
On the industrial scale, potassium chlorate is produced by the salt metathesis reaction of sodium chlorate and potassium chloride:
 NaClO3 + KCl → NaCl + KClO3
The reaction is driven by the low solubility of potassium chlorate in water. The equilibrium of the reaction is shifted to the right hand side by the continuous precipitation of the product (Le Chatelier's Principle). The precursor sodium chlorate is produced industrially in very large quantities by electrolysis of sodium chloride, common table salt.

The direct electrolysis of KCl in aqueous solution is also used sometimes, in which elemental chlorine formed at the anode reacts with KOH in situ. The low solubility of KClO3 in water causes the salt to conveniently isolate itself from the reaction mixture by simply precipitating out of solution.

Potassium chlorate can be produced in small amounts by disproportionation in a sodium hypochlorite solution followed by metathesis reaction with potassium chloride:
3 NaOCl(aq) → 2 NaCl(s) + NaClO3(aq)
KCl(aq) + NaClO3(aq) → NaCl(aq) + KClO3(s)

It can also be produced by passing chlorine gas into a hot solution of caustic potash:
3 Cl2(g) + 6 KOH(aq) → KClO3(aq) + 5 KCl(aq) + 3 H2O(l)

Uses

Potassium chlorate was one key ingredient in early firearms percussion caps (primers). It continues in that application, where not supplanted by potassium perchlorate.

Chlorate-based propellants are more efficient than traditional gunpowder and are less susceptible to damage by water. However, they can be extremely unstable in the presence of sulfur or phosphorus and are much more expensive. Chlorate propellants must be used only in equipment designed for them; failure to follow this precaution is a common source of accidents. Potassium chlorate, often in combination with silver fulminate, is used in trick noise-makers known as "crackers", "snappers", "pop-its", or "bang-snaps", a popular type of novelty firework.

Another application of potassium chlorate is as the oxidizer in a smoke composition such as that used in smoke grenades. Since 2005, a cartridge with potassium chlorate mixed with lactose and rosin is used for generating the white smoke signaling the election of new pope by a papal conclave.

Potassium chlorate is often used in high school and college laboratories to generate oxygen gas.  It is a far cheaper source than a pressurized or cryogenic oxygen tank. Potassium chlorate readily decomposes if heated while in contact with a catalyst, typically manganese(IV) dioxide (MnO2). Thus, it may be simply placed in a test tube and heated over a burner. If the test tube is equipped with a one-holed stopper and hose, warm oxygen can be drawn off. The reaction is as follows:
2 KClO3(s) ->[\Delta][MnO_2] 3 O2(g) + 2 KCl(s)

Heating it in the absence of a catalyst converts it into potassium perchlorate:
4 KClO3 -> 3 KClO4 + KCl

With further heating, potassium perchlorate decomposes to potassium chloride and oxygen:
KClO4 -> KCl + 2O2

The safe performance of this reaction requires very pure reagents and careful temperature control. Molten potassium chlorate is an extremely powerful oxidizer and spontaneously reacts with many common materials such as sugar. Explosions have resulted from liquid chlorates spattering into the latex or PVC tubes of oxygen generators, as well as from contact between chlorates and hydrocarbon sealing greases. Impurities in potassium chlorate itself can also cause problems. When working with a new batch of potassium chlorate, it is advisable to take a small sample (~1 gram) and heat it strongly on an open glass plate. Contamination may cause this small quantity to explode, indicating that the chlorate should be discarded.

Potassium chlorate is used in chemical oxygen generators (also called chlorate candles or oxygen candles), employed as oxygen-supply systems of e.g. aircraft, space stations, and submarines, and has been responsible for at least one plane crash. A fire on the space station Mir was traced to oxygen generation candles that use a similar lithium perchlorate. The decomposition of potassium chlorate was also used to provide the oxygen supply for limelights.

Potassium chlorate is used also as a pesticide. In Finland it was sold under trade name Fegabit.

Potassium chlorate can react with sulfuric acid to form a highly reactive solution of chloric acid and potassium sulfate:

2 KClO3 + H2SO4 → 2 HClO3 + K2SO4

The solution so produced is sufficiently reactive that it spontaneously ignites if combustible material (sugar, paper, etc.) is present.

In schools, molten potassium chlorate is used in the dramatic screaming jelly babies, Gummy bear, Haribo, and Trolli candy demonstration where the candy is dropped into the molten salt.

In chemical labs it is used to oxidize HCl and release small amounts of gaseous chlorine.

Insurgents in Afghanistan also use potassium chlorate extensively as a key component in the production of improvised explosive devices. When significant effort was made to reduce the availability of ammonium nitrate fertilizer in Afghanistan, IED makers started using potassium chlorate as a cheap and effective alternative. In 2013, 60% of IEDs in Afghanistan used potassium chlorate, making it the most common ingredient used in IEDs.
Potassium chlorate was also the main ingredient in the car bomb used in 2002 Bali bombings that killed 202 people.

Potassium chlorate is used to force the blossoming stage of the longan tree, causing it to produce fruit in warmer climates.

Safety
Potassium chlorate should be handled with care. It reacts vigorously, and in some cases spontaneously ignites or explodes, when mixed with many combustible materials. It burns vigorously in combination with virtually any combustible material, even those normally only slightly flammable (including ordinary dust and lint). Mixtures of potassium chlorate and a fuel can ignite by contact with sulfuric acid, so it should be kept away from this reagent.
Sulfur should be avoided in pyrotechnic compositions containing potassium chlorate, as these mixtures are prone to spontaneous deflagration. Most sulfur contains trace quantities of sulfur-containing acids, and these can cause spontaneous ignition - "Flowers of sulfur" or "sublimed sulfur", despite the overall high purity, contains significant amounts of sulfur acids. Also, mixtures of potassium chlorate with any compound with ignition promoting properties (ex. antimony(III) sulfide) are very dangerous to prepare, as they are extremely shock sensitive.

See also
Chloric acid

References

"Chlorate de potassium. Chlorate de sodium", Fiche toxicol. n° 217, Paris:Institut national de recherche et de sécurité, 2000. 4pp.
Continuous process for the manufacture of potassium chlorate by coupling with a sodium chlorate production plant

External links

Potassium compounds
Chlorates
Pyrotechnic oxidizers